Legend of Lau Kawar is a North Sumatran folk legend about an ungrateful son who does not honor his mother. Today Lau Kawar is the name of a lake at Karo Regency, but the legend suggests that the lake was once a village.  The village, named Kawar, was drowned following an earthquake and heavy rain. The disaster was caused by God in response to a prayer from a mother asking for punishment for her sinful son.

References 

Asian mythology